1307 Cimmeria, provisional designation , is a stony asteroid from the inner regions of the asteroid belt, approximately 10 kilometers in diameter. It was discovered on 17 October 1930, by Soviet astronomer Grigory Neujmin at Simeiz Observatory on the Crimean peninsula, and later named after the Cimmerians, the ancient people of Crimea.

Orbit and classification 
 
Cimmeria orbits the Sun in the inner main-belt at a distance of 2.0–2.5 AU once every 3 years and 5 months (1,233 days). Its orbit has an eccentricity of 0.10 and an inclination of 4° with respect to the ecliptic. The first unused observation was made at the Lowell Observatory the night before its discovery. The body's observation arc begins at the discovering observatory, the night after its official discovery observation.

Physical characteristics 

On the Tholen taxonomy, Cimmeria is a common stony S-type asteroid.

Rotation and pole 

In September 2004, the best rated rotational lightcurve of Cimmeria was obtained from photometric observations by American astronomer Brian Warner at his Palmer Divide Observatory in Colorado. Lightcurve analysis gave a well-define rotation period of 2.820 hours with a brightness amplitude of 0.31 magnitude. Astronomer Daniel Klinglesmith obtained a similar period of 2.821 hours with an amplitude of 0.29 magnitude.

In addition a modeled lightcurve, using photometric data from various sources, gave a period of 2.820723 hours, as well as a spin axis of (63.0°, n.a.) in ecliptic coordinates.

Diameter and albedo 

According to the survey carried out by NASA's Wide-field Infrared Survey Explorer with its subsequent NEOWISE mission, Cimmeria measures between 7.85 and 10.058 kilometers in diameter and its surface has an albedo between 0.2218 and 0.371, while the Collaborative Asteroid Lightcurve Link assumes a standard albedo for stony asteroids of 0.20 and calculates a diameter of 10.54 kilometers with an absolute magnitude of 12.25.

Naming 

This minor planet was named after the Cimmerians, ancient inhabitants of the Crimea peninsula expelled by the Scythians in the 7th century B.C. (also see the preceding asteroid 1306 Scythia). The official naming citation is based on a private communications between the author of the Dictionary of Minor Planet Names, Lutz Schmadel, and Soviet–Moldavian astronomer Alexander Deutsch.

Notes

References

External links 
 Lightcurve plot of 1307 Cimmeria, Palmer Divide Observatory, B. D. Warner (2004)
 Asteroid Lightcurve Database (LCDB), query form (info )
 Dictionary of Minor Planet Names, Google books
 Asteroids and comets rotation curves, CdR – Observatoire de Genève, Raoul Behrend
 Discovery Circumstances: Numbered Minor Planets (1)-(5000) – Minor Planet Center
 
 

001307
Discoveries by Grigory Neujmin
Named minor planets
001307
19301017